Vesna is a folk band based in the Czech Republic, currently consisting of six members. The band is set to represent the Czech Republic in the Eurovision Song Contest 2023 with the song "My Sister's Crown".

History

Formation and first singles (2016) 
In 2016, band frontwoman Patricie Fuxová wanted to create an all-female band that celebrated femininity and Slavic sisterhood. According to Fuxová, although the band is considered to play Czech folk music, she did not consider themselves to play within the folk music genre, stating that "I don't see what we do with Vesna as folklore, they are not folk songs. For me, these are songs [don't] that work with those archetypes." At the Jaroslav Ježek Conservatory, Fuxová would meet with eventual future members Bára Šůstková, who played the violin, Andrea Šulcová, and Tanita Yankovová, who both played the flute.

Pátá bohyně (2018) 
In 2018, Šulcová and Yankovová would both leave the group, and were replaced by pianist Olesya Ochepovská and drummer Markéta Vedralová. In that same year, the band would release their first studio album, Pátá bohyně. In an interview with Czech news magazine Týden, Fuxová stated that the album was inspired by both real life events that she had faced and by Czech stories and fairytales. The album won the Discovery of the Year award at the Czech music awards show Ceny Anděl 2018.

Anima (2020) 
During the COVID-19 pandemic, the band started work on a second studio album, Anima. In an interview, band member Bára Šůstková reported that the album was represented by animal motifs, the relationship between men and women, and the female body.

Eurovision Song Contest (2023) 
On 16 January 2023, the band was revealed as one of six competitors in ESCZ 2023, the Czech national selection for the Eurovision Song Contest 2023. When the voting results were revealed on 7 February 2023, the band had earned 10,584 votes, winning by a margin of 6,368 votes, thus becoming the Czech representatives for the contest.

Discography

Albums

Singles

References 

2016 establishments in the Czech Republic
Czech folk music groups
Eurovision Song Contest entrants of 2023
Eurovision Song Contest entrants for the Czech Republic
Musical groups established in 2016